Sir Baber Shumsher Jung Bahadur Rana, GCVO, GBE, KCSI, KCIE (27 January 1888 – 12 May 1960) was a member of the Rana dynasty who served as the Minister of Defence of Nepal in 1951. A prominent member of the Rana oligarchy, he fought valiantly in the First World War. He was the second son of Maharaja Sir Chandra Shamsher Jang Bahadur Rana and Bada Maharani Chandra Loka Bhakta Lakshmi Devi. He was the younger brother of Maharaja Sir Mohan Shamsher Jang Bahadur Rana and older brother of Field Marshal Sir Kaiser Shamsher Jang Bahadur Rana.

Family
Sir Baber Shumsher Jang Bahadur Rana was born to Field Marshal H.H. Svasti Sri Madati Prachandra Bhujadandyetyadi Ati-Projjwala-Nepal-Taradisha Sri Sri Sri Maharaja Chandra Shamsher Jang Bahadur Rana, T'ung-ling-ping-ma-Kuo-Kang-wang, Maharaja of Lamjung and Kaski, GCB and Bada Maharani Chandra Loka Bhakta Lakshmi Devi on 27 January 1888, at Kathmandu. He married twice, first in 1903, to Sri Bada Rani Deva Bakhta Rajya Lakshmi; and secondly to Sri Bada Rani Baid Bakhta Rajya Lakshmi. He had three sons and two daughters:
 Bala Shamsher Jang Bahadur Rana, (died in 1921).
 Lieutenant-General Prasiddha-Prabala-Gorkha-Dakshina-Bahu Mrigendra Shamsher Jang Bahadur Rana (by Baid Bakhta Rajya Lakshmi), born in 1906.
 Major-General Subikhyat-Tri-Shakti-Patta, Prasidha-Prabala-Gorkha-Dakshina-Bahu Sir Brahma Shamsher Jang Bahadur Rana KCIE, born in 1909.
 Phanindra Rajya Lakshmi, Rani of Tiloi, born in 1908.
 Homa Rajya Lakshmi, Rani of Nayagarh, born in 1913.
General Gaurav Shamsher Jang Bahadur Rana, the chief of the Army of Nepal since 2012, is his great-grandson through his son, Mrigendra's son Adiyta Shamsher Jang Bahadur Rana.

Later life
Sir Baber Shumsher was educated at the Mayo College, Ajmer. In 1901, he was made a Major General of the Royal Nepalese Army and was promoted to Lieutenant General in 1903. After being Aide de camp to his father in 1908, he was promoted to a General in 1914, and finally to the post of Commanding General in 1934. In 1927, he was made an Honorary Colonel in the British Army. In 1946, he led the Royal Nepalese troops at the Victory parade in London. During the premiership (1948–1951) of his older brother, Sir Mohan Shamsher, Sir Baber Shamsher was the Mukhtiyar and Commander-in-Chief of the Royal Nepalese Army. In 1951, he became the Minister for Defence in the Congress Rana Cabinet led, by his brother. However he was a bete noire in the eyes of the Nepali Congress, and was replaced by his younger brother, Singha Shamsher Jang Bahadur Rana on 10 June 1951.

Death
He died at his residence at Baber Mahal, Kathmandu on 12 May 1960 (which was built for him by his father).
His brother Kaiser Shumsher Jang Bahadur Rana, died Four years later at the same age.

Honours
 Delhi Durbar silver medal, 1903
 Delhi Durbar silver medal, 1911
 Mentioned in Despatches, 1915
Sword of Honour, 1916
 Knight Commander of the Order of the Indian Empire (KCIE), 1916
 Order of the Star of Nepal, 1st Class, 1918
 British War Medal, 1918
 Commonwealth Victory Medal, 1918
 Mentioned in Despatches, 1919
 Waziristan Field Medal, 1919
 Indian General Service Medal w/ Afghanistan Clasp-1919
 Knight Commander of the Order of the Star of India (KCSI), 1919
 Knight Grand Cross of the Order of the British Empire (GBE), 1919
 Honorary Colonel, British Army, 1927
 Order of Gorkha Dakshina Bahu (Gurkha Right Hand), Member 1st Class, 1935
 Order of Tri Shakti Patta (Three Divine Powers), Member 1st Class, 1939
 Order of Om Rama Patta, Member, 1946
 Knight Grand Cross of the Royal Victorian Order (GCVO), 1946
 Chief Commander of the Legion of Merit of the US, 1946

Ancestors

References

1888 births
1960 deaths
Nepalese generals
Honorary Knights Grand Cross of the Royal Victorian Order
Honorary Knights Grand Cross of the Order of the British Empire
Honorary Knights Commander of the Order of the Star of India
Honorary Knights Commander of the Order of the Indian Empire
Recipients of the Order of the Star of Nepal
Members of the Order of Tri Shakti Patta, First Class
Members of the Order of Gorkha Dakshina Bahu, First Class
Chief Commanders of the Legion of Merit
Rana regime
Rana dynasty
20th-century Nepalese nobility
19th-century Nepalese nobility
Children of prime ministers of Nepal
Nepalese Hindus
Mayo College alumni